The Netherlands Football League Championship 1942–1943 was contested by 52 teams participating in five divisions. The national champion would be determined by a play-off featuring the winners of the eastern, northern, southern and two western football divisions of the Netherlands. ADO Den Haag won this year's championship by beating Feijenoord, Willem II, SC Enschede and sc Heerenveen.

New entrants
Eerste Klasse East:
Promoted from 2nd Division: Go Ahead 
Eerste Klasse South:
Promoted from 2nd Division: Maurits
Eerste Klasse West-I:
Moving in from West-II: HBS Craeyenhout, Hermes DVS and Sparta Rotterdam
Promoted from 2nd Division: De Volewijckers
Eerste Klasse West-II:
Moving in from West-I: AFC Ajax, Feijenoord and VUC

Divisions

Eerste Klasse East

Eerste Klasse North

Eerste Klasse South

Eerste Klasse West-I

Eerste Klasse West-II

Championship play-off

References
RSSSF Netherlands Football League Championships 1898-1954
RSSSF Eerste Klasse Oost
RSSSF Eerste Klasse Noord
RSSSF Eerste Klasse Zuid
RSSSF Eerste Klasse West

Netherlands Football League Championship seasons
Neth
1942–43 in Dutch football